Wildcard (also known as Terence Trent D'Arby's WildCard!) is Terence Trent D'Arby's fifth album. It was released in Europe on October 11, 2001, following a six-year absence from the music industry on his own independent record label, Treehouse Publishing and distributed by RockUp Records. The album spawned two singles ("O'Divina" and "What Shall I Do?) and featured both his previous and new stage name on the cover.

WildCard! - The Jokers' Edition

In the United Kingdom, the album was issued for the first time in February  2003 as Terence Trent D'Arby's WildCard! - The Jokers' Edition, with the album released by Maitreya's Sananda Records in a distribution deal with Universal. The back cover of the British version of The Jokers' Edition announced that the album was produced, written and arranged by Maitreya, marking the first time the artist solely used this name in the credits. 

In June 2003, Wildcard was also repackaged in Europe as WildCard! - The Jokers' Edition with Sananda Maitreya being the only credited artist name in many European territories.

The Jokers' Edition omitted several songs from the previously released edition and replaced them with newly recorded songs, including a new single called "What Shall I Do?". When the album was released in the United Kingdom in 2003, it received a 4 star review in The Guardian by Caroline Sullivan, who said it was an "artful blend of soul, rock and funk" and a "snazzy comeback".

Track listing

References

External links
Sananda Maitreya's Official Site Includes a more detailed discography

2001 albums
2002 albums
Terence Trent D'Arby albums